Juan Alejandro Ávila (born as Juan Alejandro Ávila González on March 29, 1973 in Mexico City) is a Mexican–American actor. He is known for playing several roles in series and telenovelas of Televisa and Telemundo. Since 2010 he has participated in various television series produced by Televisa as La rosa de Guadalupe and Como dice el dicho. His last recent participation was in Sin miedo a la verdad of the second season as of 2019.

Biography 
Juan Alejandro Avila was born on March 29, 1973 in Mexico City.

Career 
He made his debut as an actor in 2003 with a special participation in the telenovela El alma herida produced by Argos Comunicación of Telemundo, giving the role as Henry. Three years later he participated in the film in the movie Bienvenido paisano and participated in the telenovela Marina as Inspector León Felipe.

Since 2010, he joined Televisa and participated in the television series La Rosa De Guadalupe participating in various episodes.

In 2013, he participated in the television series Kipatla as Salvador. Juan participated in the telenovela La mujer del Vendaval in which he only participated in three episodes, together with the credits of Ariadne Díaz and José Ron. Also in that year, he returned to the United States to participate in the telenovela La patrona as lawyer. In 2014 he participated in the television series Dos Lunas as a military agent.

In 2015, he participated in the telenovela Los miserables portrayed Javier Arteaga. He also returned to Mexico to participate in the series Como dice el dicho. He later participated in the telenovela A que no me dejas in the second season, along with Camila Sodi and Ignacio Casano. Also in that same year, he participated in the series Escándalos:Todo es real excepto sus nombres as Vicente.

In 2016, he joined the cast of the bioserie Hasta que te conocí. In the same year, he participated in the telenovela Mujeres de negro and shortly after in the telenovela La candidata.

From 2017, he portrayed as Jacinto in the telenovela produced by Lucero Suarez Enamorándome de Ramón. Returns to the United States again to participate in the television series by Telemundo Señora Acero: La Coyote.

Filmography

Film

Television

References

External links 
 

21st-century Mexican male actors
1973 births
Living people
Male actors from Mexico City
Mexican male stage actors